Raz Meir (born 30 November 1996) is an Israeli professional footballer who plays as right-back   for Israeli Premier League club Maccabi Haifa.

Early life
Meir was born in Rishon LeZion, Israel, to a Jewish family.

Club career
He made his Israeli Premier League debut for Maccabi Haifa on 17 May 2014 in a game against Hapoel Be'er Sheva.

International career
Meir has been a youth national for Israel since 2012, playing for the U-17 team all the way to the U-21 team.

Honours

Club 
Maccabi Haifa
 Israeli Premier League: 2020–21, 2021–22
 Toto Cup: 2021–22
 Israel Super Cup: 2021

References

External links

1996 births
Living people
Israeli Jews
Israeli footballers
Footballers from Rishon LeZion
Hapoel Rishon LeZion F.C. players
Maccabi Haifa F.C. players
Bnei Yehuda Tel Aviv F.C. players
Hapoel Ashkelon F.C. players
Israeli Premier League players
Liga Leumit players
Israel under-21 international footballers
Association football defenders